Muhammadabad Islamia Alim Madrasah is an Alim (higher secondary) madrasa, situated in the Middle Paikpara of Mirpur, Dhaka, Bangladesh. It was established in 1983. It has hostel facility for non-resident students, and various services for poor students. This institute arrange various kinds of cultural programs every year. The principal of this Madrasah, Rafiqul Islam, was awarded the "Best Principal of the Dhaka City" consecutively for three times.

See also 
 Bangladesh Madrasah Education Board

References

Madrasas in Bangladesh
Alia madrasas of Bangladesh